Ivana Mašitová is  a Czech Glass Artist and Contemporary Glass Artist. She creates mainly Cast Glass Sculptures. Her works are included in many major modern art collections, such as the Victoria & Albert Museum London United Kingdom, Corning Museum of Glass New York USA, National Museum of Modern Art Tokyo Japan, National Gallery Prague the Czech Republic and many others.

"Ivana Mašitová was a student of professor Stanislav Libenský in Prague, Czech Republic. He, a world-known modern glass art icon, and his wife and collaborator, Jaroslava Brychtová, are considered leading 20th century glass artist worldwide. Thanks to her talent and creativity, Ivana Mašitová has been considered one of his best students since the very beginning of her artistic career creating extraordinary glass sculptures, objects and architectural works using manifold technologies. After many years in this art field, in addition to talent and creativity, she has extensive experience and ability to master any project with unique results and this is reason why she is a renamed artist both in her own country and abroad. And this is the reason why she is considered the follower of professor´s highly professional creativity principles and his enormous success.”

Education 
 1980–1988: UMPRUM | Academy of Arts, Architecture & Design in Prague, the Czech Republic
Atelier of Professor Stanislav Libenský and Jaroslava Brychtová 
https://www.umprum.cz/

 1976–1980: Střední uměleckoprůmyslová škola sklářská (Czech Glass School), Kamenický Šenov, the Czech Republic
The oldest glass school at the world since 1856, under UNESCO protection

Public collections 

 Victoria and Albert Museum, London, UK
 Corning Museum of Glass, New York, USA
 Brooklyn Museum, New York, USA
 National Museum of Modern Art, Tokyo, Japan
 Museum voor Sierkunst, Gent, Belgium
 Schloss Rosenau, Coburg- Museum Of Modern Glass(Europäisches Museum für modernes Glas, Coburg, Germany
 National Gallery Prague, Prague, the Czech Republic
 Museum of Decorative Arts in Prague, Prague, the Czech Republic
 Regional museum in Zdar nad Sazavou, Žďár nad Sázavou, the Czech Republic
 Moravian Gallery, Brno, the Czech Republic
 Museum of Glass and Jewellery, Jablonec nad Nisou, the Czech Republic
 East Bohemian Museum, Pardubice, the Czech Republic

Awards 
 2021 Artist of the Month December 2021, Art Alliance for Contemporary Glass, Dallas, Texas, USA 

 2021 3rd Prize Medal "Lorenzo il Magnifico"- Sculpture, Florence Biennale, XIII.International Exhibition of Contemporary Art and Design, Florence, Italy

 1989 1st Prize, Jugend-Gestaltet-Preis, Munich, Germany

Exhibitions 
 2022 Red Moon Contemporary Art Glass Gallery, Melbourne, Australia
Europe Contemporary Art Glass Exhibition (17Jul - 21Aug)

 2022 Habatat Detroit Fine Art, Royal Oak, Michigan, USA
Glass Art Fair 2022 - virtual exhibition (27Oct - 10Dec)

Habatat's 50th Glass International Exhibition - UN International Year of Glass 2022 (30Apr - 29Jul)

 2021 Habatat Galleries, West Palm Beach, Florida, USA
SOLO EXHIBITION (1Dec - 31Dec)

 2021 International Biennale of Glass, Sofia, Bulgaria

 2021 Florence Biennale XIII.International Exhibition of Contemporary Art and Design, Florence, Italy

 2021 Broft Galleries, Lerdamm, the Netherlands
SOLO EXHIBITION 

 2019 The International Exhibition of Glass, Kanazawa, Japan

 2017 Tyler Gallery, Vienna, Austria
 2015 Glass Gallery, Rouen, France
 2014 Gallery of Art, Hamburg, Germany
 2013 Czech Glass, Köln Am Rhein, Germany
 2012 Gallery Transparence, Bruxelles, Belgium
 2012 Festival of Glass, Abu Dhabi, United Arab Emirates
 2011 Art Glass Gallery, Villach, Austria
 2009 Czech Glass, Dubai, United Arab Emirates
 2008 Czech Glass, Bangkok, Thailand
 2007 Glass Gallery, Hokkaido, Japan
 2006 Art Museum, Taipei, Taiwan
 2005 Glass Gallery, Schalkwijk, the Netherlands
 2004 Gallery Clara Scremini, Paris, France
 2003 Prof. Libenský and his students, Chicago, USA
 2002 Stanislav Libensky and his School, Taipei Fine Arts Museum, Japan
 2000 Maureen Littleton Gallery, Washington DC, USA
 2000 Contemporary Czech Glass Sculpture, Takayama Museum, Japan
 1999 Nakama Gallery, Tokyo, Japan
 1998 Czech Glass, Heilbronn, Germany
 1998 Glass in Architecture, Beijing, China
 1997 Plaza Art Gallery, Toyama, Japan
 1996 Studio Glass Gallery, London, UK
 1996 Art Temporis, Paris, France
 1995 Gallery Groeneveld, Almeo, the Netherlands
 1995 BGallery, Baden Baden, Germany
 1995 Gallery Prager Cabinet, Salzburg, Austria
 1994 Gallery Sanske, Zurich, Switzerland
 1994 World Glass Now, Sapporo, Japan
 1994 World Glass Now, Hiroshima | Tokyo | Osaka, Japan
 1993 Days of Czech Culture, Munich, Germany
 1993 Center of Art Glass, Amsterdam, the Netherlands
 1993 Art Glass Centre, Schalkwijk, the Netherlands
 1993 Glass Prague Prize, Prague, the Czech Republic
 1993 Heller Gallery, New York, USA
 1992 Miller Gallery, New York, USA
 1992 Glass Gallery, Grabenhof, Austria
 1992 The Azabu Museum of Arts, Tokyo, Japan
 1991 OB ART, Paris, France
 1991 Glass Gallery, Hittfeld, Germany
 1991 Exposition Internationale Glass, Rouen, France
 1991 Configura 1, Fine Art in Europe, Erfurt, Germany
 1990 Essener Glass Gallery, Essen, Germany
 1990 Congress House, Munich, Germany
 1990 Trade Fair of Arts, Barcelona, Spain
 1989 Jugend-Gestaltet-Preis, Munich, Germany
 1989 Gallery Transparence, Bruxelles, Belgium
 1989 Czechoslovak Glass Art, Chartres, France

References

External links 
 
 
 [https://karlovarsky.denik.cz/kultura_region/kv-sun-gallery-sklo-ivany-masitove-20101020.html
 https://artuk.org/discover/artists/maitova-ivana-b-1961
 Ivana Mašitová - Artnet
 Ivana Mašitová - Czech and German Glass Art

Women glass artists
Czech artists
1961 births
Living people
People from Česká Lípa
Artists from Prague